Peterhead Academy is a six-year Comprehensive Community School in Peterhead, Aberdeenshire, Scotland. It is operated by Aberdeenshire Council.

History
The original building of Peterhead Academy was built in 1846 and was originally a boys only school The South-east (Modern Languages) wing was built in 1961 with further building in the 1970s taking the school to its current form. The extension to the school is formed of several hexagonal sections and contains the school's swimming pool. It was opened by Fraser Noble in 1978. The newer part of the Academy that is connected to the Peterhead Leisure Centre, is built on the area that used to be Peterhead Railway Station.

Peterhead Academy houses around 1,300 pupils. The Academy is split up into six houses: Arbuthnot, Buchan, Craigewan, Grange, Marischal and Slains. Each house is a different colour with Arbuthnot green, Buchan red, Craigewan yellow, Grange purple, Marischal blue and Slains Turquoise. At one point there used to be eight houses: the six previously mentioned, plus Ugie and Ravenscraig. The Academy's motto is "Domus Super Petram Aedificata" (A House Built on a Rock).

Community School Network
In addition to Peterhead Academy, the Peterhead Community School Network consists of Anna Ritchie School, Boddam School, Buchanhaven Primary School, Burnhaven School, Clerkhill School, Dales Park School, Longhaven School, Meethill School, Peterhead Central School, Port Erroll School and St Fergus School.

Former pupils
 George Mackenzie Dunnet (1928–1995), ornithologist and ecologist
 Alexander Charles Farquharson (1864–1961), Member of Parliament (1918–1922), doctor, barrister and soldier
 Flora Garry (1900–2000), poet
 Isabella Leitch, nutritionist.
 Stuart MacLeod (b.1980), magician
 Connor McLennan, (b.1999) professional footballer
 Colin Mark (b.1936), Lexicographer, Author
 Frederick Martin (1882–1950), Member of Parliament (1922–1924)

References

Schools in Peterhead
Secondary schools in Aberdeenshire